Grahi inscription is an inscription found in Chaiya, southern Thailand, written in Old Khmer language with Old Sumatran script, and dated to 1183 CE. This inscription is written on the pedestal of a bronze Buddha statue, that is stored at Wat Hua Wiang temple. The name Grahi, called Kia-lo-hi in Chinese record Zhu Fan Zhi, is considered to be the old name of Chaiya. The city was part of Tambralinga, once a border polity between Srivijaya and Khmer kingdoms in the Malay Peninsula.

Text 
The transliteration of the inscription according to Cœdès is as follows:
 11006 (sic)

Translation 
The approximate translation of the inscription is as follows:
In the year of Saka 1105 (1183 CE), on the orders of Kamraten An Maharaja Srimat Trailokyaraja Maulibhusanavarmadeva, on the third day of the rising month of Jyestha, Wednesday, Mahasenapati Galanai [Talanai], who governs the land of Grahi, invited Mraten Sri Nano to create this statue. The weight of samrit is 1 bhara 2 tula and the value of gold is 10 tamlin. This statue has been erected so that all the faithful can enjoy, venerate, and adore it here .... obtain the omniscience ..

See also 
 Chaiya District in southern Thailand
 Dharmasraya kingdom
 Mauli dynasty
 Srivijaya kingdom
 Tambralinga kingdom

References 

Inscriptions of Thailand
Khmer language
Sumatran script